Katherine Thomson may refer to:
 Katherine Thomson (Australian writer), Australian playwright and screenwriter
 Katherine Thomson (English writer), English novelist and historian

See also
 Katherine Thompson (disambiguation)